"CeCe Peniston" also known as "EP Live" is a digital EP by the artist CeCe Peniston and released on July 14, 2008, on One Media Publishing.

The lead track of the EP (recorded in April 2007 at Avalon, Hollywood) featured Peniston's R&B hit from 1992 "Keep On Walkin'. The other tracks included Last Dance (cover version of the Donna Summer's hit from 1978), and her own Finally from 1991.

The virtual EP was later attached to the live CD Divas of Disco – Live, which was released on Pegasus in 2010 in Europe. Since January 14, 2011 the EP is manufactured on demand by CreateSpace (part of the Amazon) also on CD.

On March 1, 2013, an edited version of the EP was reissued as a digital download through Jersey/Delta along with a different art work and a modified track list.

Credits and personnel
 CeCe Peniston - lead vocal
 Jean McClain - back vocal
 Sabrina Sloan - back vocal
 Ed Roth - music director, piano
 Bryant Simpson - bass guitar
 Linda Taylor - guitar
 Billy Steinway - keyboards
 Mitch Waddell - audio remix

Additional credits notes
 "Keep On Walkin'" - written by Steve Hurley, Marc Williams, Kym Sims
 "Last Dance"  - written by Paul Jabara
 "Finally" - written by CeCe Peniston, Felipe Delgado, E.L. Linnear

Track listings and formats

References

General

Specific

External links
 

2008 debut EPs
CeCe Peniston EPs